Wenzel Sukowaty (August 31, 1746July 9, 1810) was an Austrian music copyist. His shop was founded 1784, but payment records show that he was the principal music copyist for the Viennese court theatres from 1778 to 1796.
Sukowaty is a character in the film Eroica, as a copyist for Ludwig van Beethoven.

References

1746 births
1810 deaths
Businesspeople from Vienna
Music copyists